Erbessa ovia is a moth of the family Notodontidae first described by Herbert Druce in 1893. It is found in Ecuador, Peru and Brazil.

References

Moths described in 1893
Notodontidae of South America